John of Lancaster, Duke of Bedford KG (20 June 1389 – 14 September 1435) was a medieval English prince, general and statesman who commanded England's armies in France during a critical phase of the Hundred Years' War. Bedford was the third son of King Henry IV of England, brother to Henry V, and acted as regent of France for his nephew Henry VI. Despite his military and administrative talent, the situation in France had severely deteriorated by the time of his death.

Bedford was a capable administrator and soldier, and his effective management of the war brought the English to the height of their power in France. However, difficulties mounted after the arrival of Joan of Arc, and his efforts were further thwarted by political divisions at home and the wavering of England's key ally, Duke Philip of Burgundy and his faction, the Burgundians. In the last years of Bedford's life, the conflict devolved into a war of attrition, and he became increasingly unable to gather the necessary funds to prosecute the conflict.

Bedford died during the congress of Arras in 1435, just as Burgundy was preparing to abandon the English cause and conclude a separate peace with Charles VII of France.

Birth and family

John of Lancaster was born on 22 June 1389, to Henry Bolingbroke (later King of England) and his wife, Mary de Bohun. His birthplace is unknown but some historians speculate that he was born in Kenilworth Castle, Warwickshire. He was a grandson of John of Gaunt, Duke of Lancaster, a son of King Edward III. 

His father, Henry Bolingbroke, was exiled in 1399 by his cousin, Richard II, when his father participated in the revolt of the Lords Appellant in 1388, the year before his birth. Upon the death of John of Gaunt, Richard II did not allow Bolingbroke to inherit his father's duchy of Lancaster. That year Bolingbroke, with help from the nobility, was able to gather supporters and deposed Richard II, who later died of starvation either by his own will or by force. Bolingbroke was crowned King of England, as Henry IV, on 13 October 1399.

John's eldest sibling was Henry of Monmouth, later King of England as Henry V. John's other siblings were Thomas of Lancaster, Duke of Clarence; Humphrey, Duke of Gloucester; Philippa; and Blanche.

After his father's accession to the throne of England as Henry IV in 1399, John began to accumulate lands and lucrative offices. He was knighted on 12 October 1399 at his father's coronation, and made a Knight of the Garter by 1402. Between 1403 and 1405, grants of the forfeited lands from the House of Percy and of the alien priory of Ogbourne, Wiltshire, considerably increased his income. 

He was appointed master of the mews and falcons in 1402, Constable of England in 1403 and Warden of the East March from 1403 to 1414. He was created Earl of Kendal, Earl of Richmond and Duke of Bedford in 1414 by his brother, King Henry V.

Military campaigns

His brother, Henry V, led a campaign against France in 1415. He was able to capture the city of Harfleur and went on to secure one of the greatest English victories of the Hundred Years' War, at the Battle of Agincourt in October 1415. In 1416, Henry placed John in command of a fleet taking supplies to Harfleur, which overcame a fleet of the Franco-Genoese navy. Henry was able to capture the cities of Rouen and Caen and soon most of France was under English control. 

John, Duke of Lancaster led English armies against the Kingdom of Scotland while his brother fought the French in mainland Europe. Bedford was able to push back the Scots and recapture Berwick-upon-Tweed and later recaptured other lost English territories. After he secured a peace treaty, the port city of Berwick remained in English hands and likewise many other towns and cities such as Roxburgh.

Regency

When Henry V died in 1422, Bedford vied with his younger brother, Humphrey, Duke of Gloucester, for control of the Kingdom. Bedford was declared regent, but concentrated on the ongoing war in France, while Gloucester acted as Lord Protector of England during his absence. He became the guardian of Henry's infant son Henry VI and became regent on his behalf. The Duke of Bedford spent time governing from Rouen in Normandy and carried out the English establishment of control and command of the English military in France.

Campaigns in France

Bedford defeated the French several times, notably at the Battle of Verneuil, until the arrival of Joan of Arc rallied the opposition. After Joan was captured by Burgundian troops at Compiegne and then transferred to the English, Bedford had her put on trial by clergy who are listed in English government records and described by eyewitnesses as pro-English collaborators. She was executed at Rouen on 30 May 1431. Bedford then arranged a coronation for the young Henry VI in Paris.

Bedford had been Governor in Normandy between 1422 and 1432, where the University of Caen was founded under his auspices. He was an important commissioner of illuminated manuscripts, both from Paris (from the "Bedford Master" and his workshop) and England. The three most important surviving manuscripts of his are the Bedford Hours (British Library Add MS 18850) and the Salisbury Breviary (Paris BnF Ms Lat. 17294), both made in Paris, and the Bedford Psalter and Hours of about 1420–23, which is English (British Library Add MS 42131). All are lavishly decorated and are good examples of the style of the period.

Marriages

John's first marriage was to Anne of Burgundy (d. 1432), daughter of John the Fearless, on 13 May 1423 in Troyes. The couple were happily married, despite being childless. Anne died of the plague in Paris in 1432.

John's second marriage was to Jacquetta of Luxembourg, on 22 April 1433 at Thérouanne in northern France. This marriage was also childless, although Jacquetta went on to have more than a dozen children in her second marriage to Richard Woodville (later Earl Rivers). Her eldest child, Elizabeth Woodville, became queen consort of England as the spouse of Edward IV in 1464.

Succession
John died in 1435 during the Congress of Arras at his Castle of Joyeux Repos in Rouen and was buried at Rouen Cathedral, near Henry the Young King. In 1562, his grave was destroyed by Calvinists. Today, a plaque marks its former location. He had no legitimate surviving issue.

In literature
He appears in William Shakespeare's plays Henry IV, Part 1, and Henry IV, Part 2, as John of Lancaster, and in Henry V and Henry VI, Part 1, as the Duke of Bedford. In the former play, he is portrayed as being present at the Battle of Shrewsbury in 1403, when then aged 14, though no chroniclers of the time mention him.

Georgette Heyer's novel My Lord John is the first part of a never-completed trilogy focused on him that deals with his life from when he was four to about twenty. Brenda Honeyman's novel Brother Bedford covers his life from Henry V's death to his own.

In the 2011 Philippa Gregory novel, The Lady of the Rivers, John features in a minor role as the first husband of its main character Jacquetta of Luxembourg.

Arms

As a son of the sovereign, John bore the royal arms of his father King Henry IV, differenced by a label of five points per pale ermine and France.

In the Bedford Book of Hours, these arms are shown supported by an eagle collared with a crown and a sable yale all on a gold field sewn with gold "wood stocks" (cut tree stumps with roots), a heraldic badge of King Edward III, referring to Woodstock Palace. It is possible that the yale was painted in silver which has tarnished black. The shield is surrounded by a pair of banners gules which reverse in argent with the motto repeated four times: A vous entier (To you / yours entire[ly]). This may be a pun on the German Tier, i.e., beast, or on (English) tears—or 'tiers' of meaning, including tierce, referring to himself as third in line to his father's throne and by now rightful king but for the baby Henry VI. The Hours were supposedly produced as a courtship present from John to his first wife Anne.

There is a Queen's Arms public house sign from Birmingham which uses these supporters reversed and with an argent yale uncollared on a shield showing the English royal arms at left and to the right six divisions representing Lorraine. John's second wife, Jacquetta of Luxembourg, was the mother of Elizabeth Woodville, who may be this queen. Elizabeth Woodville's right to inherit these armorial supporters would seem dubious if they belonged to her mother's first husband or to his first wife. Alternatively, though equally incorrect, the arms may be her mother's used in a flattering conceit.

References

Further reading

External links
 

|-

|-

|-

|-

1389 births
1435 deaths
14th-century English people
15th-century English Navy personnel
15th-century English politicians
Peers created by Henry V
15th-century viceregal rulers
Burials at Rouen Cathedral
101
Earls of Kendal
John of Lancaster, Duke Of Bedford
Governors of Jersey
John of Lancaster, Duke of Bedford
John of Lancaster, Duke of Bedford
Knights of the Garter
Lord High Admirals of England
Lords Protector of England
Male Shakespearean characters
People of the Hundred Years' War
Regents of England
Regents of France
Sons of kings
Children of Henry IV of England
Non-inheriting heirs presumptive